An improvised fighting vehicle is an ad hoc combat vehicle resulting from modified or upgraded civilian or military non-combat vehicle, often constructed and employed by civilian insurgents, terrorists, rebels, guerrillas, partisans, criminal organizations or other forms of non-state militias and irregular armies. Such modifications usually consist of grafting improvised armour plating and fixed weapons onto a utility vehicle or pickup truck.

Various militias and official militaries have improvised such vehicles ever since the introduction of the first automobiles into military service.

During the early days, the absence of a doctrine for the military use of automobiles or of an industry dedicated to producing them led to a great deal of improvisation in the creation of early armored cars and similar vehicles.

Later, despite the advent of arms industries in many countries, several armies still resorted to using ad hoc contraptions, often in response to unexpected military situations, or as a result of the development of new tactics for which no available vehicle was suitable.

The construction of improvised fighting vehicles may also reflect a lack of means for the force that uses them. This is especially true in developing countries, where various armies and guerrilla forces have used them (e.g. during the Toyota War), as they are more affordable than military-grade combat vehicles.

Early use 

An early improvised fighting vehicle was constructed for the British Army in Dublin during the Easter Rising in 1916. It was made from a three-ton Daimler truck commandeered from the Dublin Guinness brewery. An armoured body was mounted on the truck, built from the smokeboxes of several steam locomotives. The body had loopholes cut in it for riflemen to fire through and was painted with black spots that acted as dummy loopholes to confuse snipers. A steel box protected the truck driver and steel plating covered the truck radiator.

Construction took less than one day at the Great Southern Railways workshop. After the rising, the locomotive parts were returned to the railway and the truck returned to its owners.

World War II

SAS jeeps

Created during the North African Campaign of World War II, the Special Air Service specialised in carrying out hit-and-run attacks, in particular against Axis airfields. As no vehicle was adapted to this kind of mission, the SAS were forced to build their own. Heavily modified Lend-Lease jeeps became the trademark weapon of the SAS. The windscreens, and sometimes the bumper were removed, in order to save weight and permit an extra payload to be carried. The radiator grille bars were often removed to allow more airflow to better cool the engine in the hot desert climate. Different weapons arrays were carried, including different combinations of various Browning and Vickers K machine guns according to available supply.

The SAS jeeps were used during the whole North African Campaign, and later in Europe, where they were used for sabotage missions behind enemy lines.

British home guard

The Home Guard, an armed citizen militia of the British Army as a form of invasion defense, was often inadequately equipped throughout its existence, as the more valuable and modern equipment were issued to the regular British Army. As such, the Home Guard was often outfitted with obsolete or makeshift weapons and vehicles of dubious effectiveness. Among the improvised fighting vehicle developed for use by the Home Guard include the Armadillo, the Bison, the OXA, and the Standard Beaverette.

Soviet tractor tanks

An improvised Soviet armoured fighting vehicle, based on an STZ-5 agricultural tractor, manufactured in Odessa during the early stages of World War II. The NI tank's name is an abbreviation of "Na Ispug", which literally translates to "for fear". It was also called the "Odessa tank" and "terror tank". Another type of vehicle was KhTZ-16 (named after the Kharkiv Tractor Factory) based on the chassis of an STZ-3 tractor.

Kubuś

An improvised armoured car built on a Chevrolet 157 truck chassis by the Polish resistance Home Army in 1944.

Modern times

Technicals

Typically a civilian or military non-combat vehicle, modified to provide an offensive capability. It is usually an open-backed civilian pickup truck or 4x4 on which is mounted a recoilless rifle, a machine gun, a light anti-aircraft gun, or another relatively small weapons system.

The term "technical" used to describe such a vehicle appears to have originated in Somalia. The name is thought to have derived from use by the Red Cross there who were often forced to bribe local militias or be the victim of robbery and attacks. The money used for the bribe was then written off as "technical expenses". They are also known as battlewagons and gunwagons.

Among irregular armies, often centered around the perceived strength and charisma of warlords, the prestige power of technicals is strong. According to one article, "The Technical is the most significant symbol of power in southern Somalia. It is a small truck with large tripod machine guns mounted on the back. A warlord's power is measured by how many of these vehicles he has."

Gun trucks

An improvised military armoured vehicle used by units of regular armies or other official government armed forces, based on a conventional military transport truck, that is able to carry a large weight of weapons and armor. They have poor off-road performance, so have mainly been used by regular armies to escort military convoys in regions subject to ambush by guerrilla forces.

Narco tanks

Improvised armoured vehicles used by Mexican drug cartels, notably Los Zetas.

ISIS and YPG Armored vehicles

Multiple examples of improvised fighting vehicles have been created from multiple factions in the Syrian Civil war, and the War In Iraq.

Armament, and thickness of armor varies on different examples, along with the chassis they are designed on. They are used as SVBIED's, Armored cars, Improvised tanks, and improvised armored personnel carriers.

Ukrainian and Russian improvised armoured vehicles

See also
 Armoured warfare
 Gun truck
 Technical (vehicle)
 Narco tank

References

 
Military trucks
Paramilitary vehicles
Off-road vehicles
Improvised armoured fighting vehicles